Ethiopia generates most of its electricity from renewable energy, mainly hydropower.

Electricity supply 

In 2011, over 96% of Ethiopia's electricity was from hydropower. The country began a large program to expand electricity supply in the 2010s from 2,000 MW to 10,000 MW. This was to be done mainly with renewable sources. Wind and geothermal were included to offset seasonal differences in water levels. Ethiopia plans to export electricity to neighboring countries but transmission lines will need to be upgraded and expanded.

Most of the energy needs of Ethiopia are filled by biofuels for cooking, heating, and off-grid lighting. Petroleum, including gasoline, diesel and kerosene supply less than 7% of the country's energy supply. Solar photovoltaics is being promoted to replace fuel-based lighting and off-grid electrical supply with a solar panel assembly plant opening in Addis Ababa in early 2013. The majority of the Ethiopia's population live in rural areas and very few have access to electricity.

Ethiopia is planning for a carbon-neutral status by 2025.

This aim was set through their ambitious three-stage Growth and Transformation Plan, Ethiopia seeks to transform itself into a modern economy by 2025. According to the Ministry of Water and Energy, as of 2018, only 23% of the national populace has access to grid electricity. That figure falls even further to 10% when moving to rural areas – a figure that's smaller than the 17% average found across the rest of Africa. Drought frequency, flooding, poor land management techniques, and a rapidly growing population all have increased the situations direness. As of 2018, Ethiopia had launched the National Electrification Program which aimed for 65% of the population to be grid-connected by 2025.

Hydropower 
Hydropower Dams built in Ethiopia provided over 1,500 MW of capacity by 2010. The four largest dams were built between 2004 and 2010. Gilgel Gibe III added 1,870 MW in 2016.

The Grand Ethiopian Renaissance Dam (GERD) will be one of the largest hydropower dams in Africa and among the largest in the world. When completed it will be able to generate 6,450 MW, almost triple Ethiopia's entire national capacity compared to 2010.

Over 70% of the freshwater resources that Ethiopia has access to can be found at the Blue Nile River Basin. Here, three river systems, the Abbay (44%), Baro-Akobo (20%), and Tekeze (6%) provide the country with vital water resources. Ethiopia's government is planning on tapping into this technology five-fold in the coming years.

Egypt has expressed concerns that their water rights are being violated by these upstream dams but Ethiopia has no water treaty with Egypt.

Wind power
Ethiopia plans 800 MW of wind power. As the dry season is also the windy season, wind power is a good complement to hydropower. Ethiopia has benefitted from the creation and sustainment of two large wind power systems. In October 2013 the largest wind farm on the continent, the Adama plants, started capturing energy in Ethiopia. The Adama 1 plant has a capacity to produce 51 MW while the Adama 2 plant has a capacity to generate 51 MW. Another farm of note is the Ashegoda wind farm and the Ashegoda Expansion wind farm which together produce roughly 120 MW of electricity. The Chinese firm Hydrochina estimated total wind power potential to be as high as 1.3 million MW.

Geothermal
Ethiopia has one geothermal plant, the 7 MW Aluto Langano Geothermal Pilot Plant. This is being expanded to 70 MW in 2015.

Ethiopia is planning to build geothermal plants to offset restraints on power production by hydroplants due to seasonal water variation. American-Icelandic company Reykjavik Geothermal has an agreement to develop a 1000 MW geothermal farm. The first 500 MW would be completed by 2018.

A study funded by the Climate and Development Knowledge Network found that the Ethiopian approach to geothermal development puts little focus on involving the private sector in risk mitigation and fails to build the capacity needed for flows of significant private sector finance. The study found that international, multilateral and bilateral institutions should: 
 Support technical assistance and capacity building, which takes into account the needs of all relevant stakeholders involved within specific country and market contexts. 
 Provide targeted concessional finance by taking into account all possible risk mitigation instruments during project development, and by envisioning the leverage of private finance as early as possible. 
 Use insurance instruments to target specific, well defined risks: this can offer very high leverage ratios on the use of public funds, and crowd in private sector insurance capital.

Biofuels
Over 91% of the primary energy supply in Ethiopia is coming from biomass as of 2015 (45.8 out of 49.9 MTOE). Additionally, in the final sectors of Ethiopian society more than 90% of the energy is coming from biomass and of that 99% is consumed by direct residencies. Often coming in the form of animal product and forestry, natural resources, biomass as a renewable energy source is utilized extensively by direct residences and the final sector. Over time Ethiopia's forests have shrunk from covering 35% of the country at the turn of the twentieth century to under 15% currently. This loss can primarily be attributed to population growth. The country's developed a strategy it calls the Woody Biomass Inventory and Strategic Planning Project to attempt to combat the noticeable degradation of vegetation cover and address resource shortages for future industrial and energy needs. As of 2008, 85% of Ethiopia's population almost exclusively relied on two types of biomass fuels for cooking: woody biomass and dung. Such a reliance on biomass backed fuels has been linked to the over 72,400 indoor air pollution caused deaths that occur annually in Ethiopia. The government plans to distribute 9 million more efficient stoves by 2015 to reduce wood use while improving air quality and lowering  emissions.

Exports
As Ethiopia produces more power than it consumes, it has become a regional power exporter. In 2015, it sells electricity to Kenya, Sudan and Djibouti and has future contracts for power sales to Tanzania, Rwanda, South Sudan and Yemen. The Eastern African Power Pool will expand transmission lines to make this possible. Exports to Egypt and Sudan are possible after the completion of the Grand Ethiopian Renaissance Dam.

See also

 Energy in Ethiopia
 List of power stations in Ethiopia

References

 
Power stations in Ethiopia